D528 connects the A4 motorway Varaždin interchange to the D2 and D3 state roads, just to the south of the City of Varaždin. The eastern terminus of the road is an intersection with the D2 and D3 state roads, which are concurrent at that location.

The road, as well as all other state roads in Croatia, is managed and maintained by Hrvatske ceste, state owned company.

Traffic volume 

The D528 state road traffic volume is not reported by Hrvatske ceste. However, they regularly count and report traffic volume on the A4 motorway Varaždin interchange, which connects to the D528 road only, thus permitting the D528 road traffic volume to be accurately calculated. The report includes no information on ASDT volumes.

Road junctions and populated areas

Maps

Sources

See also
 A4 motorway

State roads in Croatia
Varaždin County